Kuh-e Heydar (also Romanized as Kūh-e Ḩeydar) is a village in Jakdan Rural District, in the Central District of Bashagard County, Hormozgan Province, Iran. At the 2006 census, its population was 646, in 111 families.

References 

Populated places in Bashagard County